Abbas Farid (born 10 October 1983) is a British freestyle footballer from Newport, South Wales. Farid is of Pakistani descent.

In June 2003, Abbas was named the Freestyle King on MTV in UK's Nike Freestyle competition, becoming the winner chosen from over 30,000 competitors. He subsequently featured in several music videos for bhangra/desi artists, such as in Jay Sean's music video of Dance with You (Nachna Tere Naal). Abbas has done many performances at football stadiums such as Stamford Bridge, Stade de France, San Siro etc. He still performs at other Sporting/Corporate events and other media promotions around UK and throughout the World. In July 2008 Abbas set a new Guinness World Record of 88 Heel Juggles in 60 seconds.

See also
 Freestyle football
 World Freestyle Football Association

References

External links
Abbas Farid Official site

Freestyle footballers
Welsh footballers
Welsh people of Pakistani descent
Footballers from Newport, Wales
1983 births
Living people
British sportspeople of Pakistani descent
Association footballers not categorized by position